= Jeff Gaffner =

American vintner and winemaker

Jeff Gaffner is an American vintner and winemaker.

Gaffner's career as a winemaker started in 1981 at the Chateau St. Jean winery in Sonoma, California under the guidance of Richard Arrowood. In 1997 Gaffner started Saxon Brown Wines in Sonoma. Along with Saxon Brown, Gaffner has received critical acclaim as the consulting winemaker for high end boutique labels from Xtant Wines, Hestan Vineyards, and Black Kite Cellars.
